Art Rooijakkers (born 29 August 1976) is a Dutch television presenter. He is best known as the presenter of the popular television show Wie is de Mol? from 2012 to 2018.

Career 

In 2011, he presented the Dutch version of the game show Fort Boyard, alongside Dutch radio DJ Gerard Ekdom. In the same year, he also participated as candidate in the popular television show Wie is de Mol?. He won the show by identifying the mole (Patrick Stoof) and he went on to present the show himself from 2012 to 2018. Rooijakkers succeeded Pieter Jan Hagens as presenter of the show and Rik van de Westelaken succeeded Rooijakkers in 2019.

He appeared as news reader in the 2012 film De club van lelijke kinderen. He also participated as contestant in the game shows Weet Ik Veel (in 2013) and Ik hou van Holland (in 2009 and 2011). In 2014, he won that year's summer edition of the quiz show De Slimste Mens.

From 2011 till 2014 he presented Cash op Zolder, the Dutch version of the British television show Cash in the Attic. In 2014, he presented Bureau Rooijakkers en Verster together with Lauren Verster, a show about social issues. In 2015, he appeared in an episode of the television show Familie Kruys.

In 2018, he decided to work for the broadcast organisation RTL Nederland and he presented the game show Praat Nederlands met me later that year. In the show the questions revolve around the Dutch language and how language is used in society. In October 2018, he also co-presented the game show Holland-België together with Jonas Van Geel. The show featured 'team Netherlands' and 'team Belgium' competing against each other with Ruben Nicolai and Louis Talpe featuring as team captains respectively.

In the summer of 2019 he presented the talk show Zomer met Art for ten weeks. The show featured a different co-presenter in each week, including Merel Westrik, Gert Verhulst, Richard Groenendijk and Ellie Lust. In 2019, he also presented the second season of Praat Nederlands met me. He also presented the show Iedereen had het erover in which he talks to people that became part of a well-known and often widely discussed news event. In 2021, he presented Iedereen had het erover: Coronaspecial, an episode of the show in which he talks to people affected by the COVID-19 pandemic in the Netherlands.

In 2020, he appeared in the photography game show Het perfecte plaatje in which contestants compete to create the best photo in various challenges. He also presents the television show Rooijakkers over de vloer in which he visits national and international celebrities. The show is the successor to the show Van der Vorst Ziet Sterren which was presented by Peter van der Vorst for 16 seasons. In 2021, he presented B&B Vol Liefde in which he followed bed and breakfast owners in their search for love.

In December 2021 and January 2022, he presented a season of De Verraders which aired on Videoland. In 2022, Rooijakkers and Geraldine Kemper present the Expeditie Robinson: All Stars season of the television series Expeditie Robinson. , he is scheduled to present the third season of the show.

Filmography

As presenter 

 Peking Express (2006 – 2008)
 Fort Boyard (2011)
 Wie is de Mol? (2012 – 2018)
 Bureau Rooijakkers en Verster (2014)
 De Erfenis van Anne Frank (2015)
 Het beste brein van Nederland (2016, 2017)
 Helden van de Wildernis (2017)
 Holland-België (2018)
 Praat Nederlands met me (2018, 2019)
 Zomer met Art (2019)
 Iedereen had het erover (2019)
 Rooijakkers over de vloer (2020)
 B&B Vol Liefde (2021, 2022)
 De Verraders (2021, 2022)
 Expeditie Robinson: All Stars (2022)

As actor 

 De club van lelijke kinderen (2012)
 Familie Kruys (2015)

As contestant 

 Ik hou van Holland (2009 and 2011)
 Wie is de Mol? (2011)
 Weet Ik Veel (2013)
 De Slimste Mens (2014)
 Het perfecte plaatje (2020)

References

External links

 

1976 births
Living people
Dutch game show hosts
Dutch male television actors
People from Geldrop
21st-century Dutch people